Čadrg (in older sources also Čadra and Čaderg) is a settlement in the Municipality of Tolmin in the Littoral region of Slovenia.  It lies within Triglav National Park.

Name
Čadrg was attested in written sources in 1257 as Zadroc (and as Zadroch and Çadrach in 1377, Tschadrach in 1515, and Tschadra in 1523).  The name probably derives from the Slavic personal name *Ča(je)dragъ, referring to an early resident of the place. Discounted theories of the name's derivation include development from Latin cataracta 'waterfall' or Friulian chadrèe 'chair' (referring to a terrace).

A nice outing destination 
The village is a nice outing destination, but you have to go through it on foot. It's even better to go by the whole terrace and visit the Zlejžn promontory, or to ascend any of the South Bohinj Range mountains.

References

External links 
Čadrg on Geopedia

Populated places in the Municipality of Tolmin